Kingdom of Summer is the second book in a trilogy of fantasy novels written by Gillian Bradshaw. The novel tells of the ascendancy of King Arthur and the planting of the seeds of his downfall. The tale is recounted by Rhys ap Sion, a Dumnonian farmer who becomes the servant of Gwalchmai ap Lot (the hero of the preceding book, Hawk of May).

Plot

In winter, Rhys and his cousin encounter a mounted warrior named Gwalchmai. He accompanies them to their householding for shelter from the cold. There, he is recognized by the head of the clan (and Rhys' father), Sion ap Rhys, who had befriended Gwalchmai before he became renowned throughout Britain.

This chance meeting changes the course of Rhys's life. He had aspired to be more than a simple farmer. Despite his parents' disapproval, he asks Gwalchmai to accept him as a servant. As a favor to his father, Gwalchmai agrees only to take him to Camlann, King Arthur's stronghold, where he can find himself a master.

But first, Gwalchmai continues his search for a woman, to beg her forgiveness. He had been sent on an embassy to King Bran, an enemy of Arthur, to keep an eye on him. While there, he had fallen in love with and seduced Elidan, the king's sister. Bran found out and used it as an excuse to rebel. During the resulting battle, Gwalchmai killed Bran, though he had promised Elidan he wouldn't. As a result, her love turned to hatred, and she disappeared. He is unable to find any news of her and he and Rhys travel to Camlann.

When they arrive, Gwalchmai keeps Rhys as his servant, to their mutual satisfaction. Rhys finds the fortress a pleasant place; all there are caught up, to varying degrees, with Arthur's vision of uniting and bringing peace to the land.

After a month's rest, Gwalchmai is sent as an ambassador to King Maelgwn, one of Arthur's greatest foes. Rhys and Rhuawn, one of Arthur's warriors, accompany him. Spies had reported foreigners visiting him and Arthur fears that he is allying with a king of Erin. When they arrive, Gwalchmai is shocked to find that his own mother, the infamous witch Morgawse, is the one plotting with Maelgwn. Also there are his father King Lot and his younger brother Medraut.

During their stay, Rhys becomes attracted to Eivlin, one of Morgawse's servants. Meanwhile, Medraut begins to charm Rhuawn and Rhys, planting doubts about Gwalchmai's sanity, using the well-known fact that he became a berserker in battle. Rhuawn is won over, but not Rhys. Seeing this, Medraut changes tactics.

Rhys is taken by force to Morgawse. She uses magic to try to break his will, but he resists stubbornly. When Medraut leaves the room, Eivlin follows and knocks him unconscious. Needing Medraut's assistance to break Rhys, Morgawse goes in search of him, giving Eivlin the opportunity to free Rhys and flee with him.

The witch casts a spell to kill her. When Eivlin is struck down, Rhys does the only thing he can think of - he baptizes her by the roadside. Then, he searches desperately for help. He runs into a young boy named Gwyn, who takes them to his mother, a nun named Elidan. By chance, Rhys has found Gwalchmai's lost love - and their son.

Medraut tracks Rhys down and takes him back to his mother, only to find Gwalchmai there. Gwalchmai defeats Morgawse in a battle of magic, leaving her exhausted, but physically unharmed.

Rhys takes his master to Eivlin; Gwalchmai is able to awaken her. Then he tries to reconcile with Elidan or at least gain her forgiveness, but she is unmoved. Rhys had reluctantly promised her not to reveal Gwyn's identity, so Gwalchmai departs with his misery unabated.

They return to Maelgwn's fortress, where more tragic news awaits. Agravain had arrived to visit his father. In the middle of speaking together, Lot suddenly died for no apparent reason. While Gwalchmai was away, Agravain killed his mother for murdering Lot. In a rage, Medraut decides to go to Camlann, to see his father - Arthur - and to conspire against him. Arthur's downfall is set in motion.

1982 American novels
American fantasy novels
Modern Arthurian fiction
Novels set in sub-Roman Britain
Signet Books books